Just Before Dawn may refer to:

 Just Before Dawn (1946 film), an American crime film directed by William Castle
 Just Before Dawn (1981 film), an American slasher film directed by Jeff Lieberman
 The Original Jill Scott from the Vault, Vol. 1 (working title: Just Before Dawn: Jill Scott from the Vault, Vol. 1), a 2011 album by Jill Scott